The Blues Brothers is a platform game based on the band The Blues Brothers, where the object is to evade police and other vigilantes to get to a blues concert. The game was released for IBM PC, Amstrad CPC, Amiga, Commodore 64, and Atari ST in 1991, and for the NES and Game Boy in 1992. It was created by Titus France. A sequel, The Blues Brothers: Jukebox Adventure, was released for the SNES in 1993 (as The Blues Brothers) and for IBM PC compatibles and the Game Boy in 1994. The theme music of the video game is an electronic arrangement of Peter Gunn. Zzap!64 ranked the Commodore 64 port the eighth-best all-time Commodore 64 game in 1993, and the game was the best platformer for PC, Atari ST and Amiga consoles of 1991 of Zero journalist David Wilson.

Gameplay

The characters have the ability to pick up boxes to throw them at enemies. Each level is a variation on the jumping theme, with the characters finding a necessary attribute (e.g. a guitar) somewhere in the level. The sixth and final level ends on-stage.

The game can be played by two players simultaneously, but the scrolling screen only focuses on one of them.

The game's soundtrack consists of music from the movie. Dimitris Yerasimos composed the music for all versions of the game except for the Game Boy, where Thorsten Mitschele composed the music.

Notes

References

External links

The Blues Brothers screenshot gallery at welovedosgames.net
The Blues Brothers can be played for free in the browser on the Internet Archive

Blues Brothers
Blues Brothers
Blues BrothersAdd
Blues Brothers
Commodore 64 games
Blues Brothers
Blues Brothers
Video games based on musicians
Blues Brothers
Platform games
Blues Brothers
Blues Brothers
Blues Brothers
Band-centric video games